National Ticketing Solution (NTS) is a public transport payment system in development for New Zealand. It is contracted to American company Cubic. It is expected to start roll out in the Canterbury region in 2024 and available nationwide by 2026.

It was previously known by various  names such as Project NEXT, the National Ticketing Programme (NTP), the Auckland Integrated Ticketing Scheme (AITS) and Auckland Integrated Fares System (AIFS) prior to that.

The aim is to achieve a nationally consistent payment system, with a choice of payment by cash, phone, credit card, debit card, or a transit card valid for the whole country. Whilst work at a national level has been undertaken since 2009, work is still ongoing. As of 2022, there are four public transport cards in use in New Zealand which are not interoperable: AT HOP card in Auckland, Snapper card in Wellington, Bee Card used in nine smaller regional councils, and Metrocard in Christchurch.

History

Background
The desire to achieve a nationwide public transport payment system was first raised in 2007 when it was announced that Snapper was working on a stored-value card for public transport in the Wellington Region, with Wellington and Auckland transport officials in talks about teaming up to work on a system that could be applied nationwide.

Wellington: Snapper card
The Snapper card was introduced in Wellington in July 2008 and applied to buses operated under the GO Wellington branding; those buses were owned by NZ Bus. The company that owned both Snapper (until May 2019) and NZ Bus (until September 2019) is infrastructure investment company Infratil. The Snapper card was not valid on services not owned by NZ Bus, e.g. Mana bus, the Wellington Cable Car, ferries, or the Metlink trains. In late 2022 Snapper will be fully rolled out on all train lines in the Wellington Region, meaning the only form of transport missing integrated ticketing will be the Harbour Ferry.

Auckland Integrated Ticketing Scheme

The NZ Transport Agency joined the discussions held between Auckland and Wellington officials in 2009. The Transport Agency's board signed off on NZTA joining in October 2009 in the context of the Auckland Regional Transport Authority (ARTA, which was succeeded by Auckland Transport in November 2010) tendering for an integrated ticketing system for public transport in the Auckland Region named Auckland Integrated Ticketing Scheme (AITS); this was later given the brand name "HOP". The underlying thinking of the Transport Agency was that it would make sense for the development cost to be paid only once, with other regional authorities able to join and use the same technology. The Transport Agency opted to lead the project, provided co-funding, wanted to be in control of the central clearing house system, and stated that it was most interested in getting information out of the system. The Transport Agency's aim was to develop the National Integrated Ticketing Interoperability Standard (NITIS).

ARTA awarded the tender for the Auckland stored-value card to the Thales Group as the French technology on offer was technically superior to what Snapper had offered. The Thales Group offered a technical solution based on the DESFire system, which at the time was the international industry standard for public transport payment systems. Snapper's system used the Java Card OpenPlatform, which is common for payment systems but with slower transaction times, which is an issue for mass payments. Snapper lodged a complaint, later dismissed, questioning the legitimacy of the tender process.

In spite of this, Snapper announced in late-2009 that it would begin rolling out its "comprehensive integrated ticketing" system onto all NZ Bus services (but no other Auckland bus company or service). The announcement was made without communication with the Transport Agency or ARTA, the latter of which called the Snapper announcement "premature" citing the development of the Thales system and confirming that all public transport operators in Auckland, including NZ Bus, would be required to participate.

Replacing ARTA in 2010, Auckland Transport announced it had invited Snapper to work with the council-controlled organisation and Thales on the ticketing system. Infratil went ahead and fitted out its NZ Bus fleet in Auckland with hardware that could read their Snapper card, on the condition that Snapper would adjust its system so that it could interact with the Thales components, this was sanctioned by NZTA staff. Snapper, based on its system already in use in Wellington, could roll out the system more quickly and the aim was to be operational on the entire NZ Bus fleet for the Rugby World Cup to be held in New Zealand from 9 September 2011.

In April 2011, Auckland Transport launched the "HOP card", developed by Snapper, with initial rollout on all NZ Bus services.

In August 2012, Auckland Transport terminated its agreement with Snapper over an ongoing inability to configure their system to work smoothly with the Thales Group system. Snapper said it would sue Auckland Transport as a result.

Labour opposition spokesperson for Housing and Auckland Issues, Phil Twyford, alleged in parliament in November 2012 that there had been political interference, with the Minister of Transport, Steven Joyce, having instructed Transport Agency officials for Snapper to be included in the Auckland project. The Office of the Auditor-General later opened an investigation into the matter.

Auckland Transport then rolled out the AT HOP card from October 2012 (starting with trains and ferries) until April 2014 (finishing with buses). The contract with the Thales Group runs until 2021, with an option to extend it to 2026. Improvements to the system to enable features like contactless and mobile payments have been stopped as a result of Auckland Transport joining the National Ticketing Programme.

Wellington: Integrated ticketing
The Wellington Regional Council announced in May 2013 that they were investigating an integrated ticketing system for the Wellington region. At the time, they thought that they would be tendering the new system in circa 2016. Transport Agency staff approached the Wellington Regional Council in December 2015, suggesting that they introduce the Hop card system, therefore working towards having a unified system for the country. Part of the Transport Agency's proposal was that its subsidiary, New Zealand Transport Ticketing Limited (NZTTL, established in November 2011), be appointed to act as the central clearing house. Under the leadership of Paul Swain, the chair of Wellington Region's transport committee, the Transport Agency's approach was rejected. One generic argument against a single system is that it would create a monopoly, whereas with more than one system there is "healthy" competition. Another argument for rejection was that by then, the technology had moved on, from closed-loop card-based systems to account-based systems. The latter includes the possibility that payments get made via smartphones, debit cards and credit cards, removing the need for users to have a proprietary payment card linked to a public transport provider. At the same time, it was announced that the tender for the Wellington integrated system would now happen by 2018.

Regional Consortium: Bee Card
Nine of the smaller regional councils formed the Regional Consortium in 2013, a collaborative working group that could represent their shared interests in public transport matters. These regions are (from north to south):
 Northland
  Waikato
 Bay of Plenty
 Hawke's Bay
 Taranaki
 Manawatū-Whanganui
 Nelson
 Otago
 Southland

By late 2013, service level agreements had been put in place for the coming three years in support of the existing ticketing systems; it was thought that this was a sufficient time frame for the National Integrated Ticketing Interoperability Standard (NITIS) to be ready. The smaller regions could subsequently procure systems that integrate with the national ticketing system. The governance group of the Regional Consortium was made up of representatives from the Transport Agency, its subsidiary NZTTL, and executives of seven of the nine regional councils. When NITIS, the critical component for integration into the national ticketing system, was not available on time, the regional councils extended their service level agreements to May 2018. In early 2016, it was agreed between the Regional Consortium, the Transport Agency, and Wellington region that the integration into the national ticketing system would no longer be pursued.

In 2017, the Regional Consortium let a contract to INIT, a German-headquartered company that provides IT solutions for public transport. Their brief is to supply a solution that has been named the Regional Integrated Ticketing System (RITS). One "tag on, tag off" stored-value (i.e. closed-loop) card for all nine regions is to be implemented. It is planned for RITS to be an interim solution for up to five years prior to joining the national ticketing system. RITS is much simpler than the open-loop account-based solution pursued for the national ticketing system.

The payment card for the Regional Consortium has been branded as the "Bee Card". Rollout of the card started:

 on 20 November 2019, with Whangarei the first city to use the system.
 The second city to receive the card was Whanganui on 9 December 2019. Other places in the Manawatū-Whanganui region (i.e. Palmerston North, Ashhurst, Feilding, Levin, and Marton) switched to the system between December 2019 and July 2020, as it was delayed over teething problems.
 Invercargill replaced its Bus Smart card with Bee Card on 22 June 2020.
 Waikato switched from BUSIT to Bee Cards on 1 July 2020.
 Bee Card was introduced to Katikati, Kawerau, Ōmokoroa, Ōpōtiki, Rotorua and Whakatāne on 20 July and to Tauranga on 27 July 2020.
 Nelson's NBus Card was replaced on 3 August 2020.
 Hawke's Bay changeover date from goBay cards is 24 August 2020.
 The Bee Card replaced the GoCard in Dunedin on 1 September and in Queenstown on 15 September 2020.
 Taranaki replaced 40-trip multi-passes on 19 October 2020.
 The Te Huia train service between Auckland and Hamilton uses the Bee Card as of its first service on 6 April 2021.
 The Bee Card replaced the previous GizzyBus smartcard used in Gisborne (which is the 10th region to do so), as of May 2022.

National Ticketing Programme: GRETS
Based on Greater Wellington's feedback, a working party was convened from 2016 under the project name of National Ticketing Programme, also known under the acronym GRETS (Greater Wellington, Regional Consortium, Environment Canterbury Ticketing Solution). Parties represented on the steering group were the Transport Agency, its subsidiary NZTTL, Bay of Plenty region, Canterbury region, Wellington region, Otago region, Taranaki region, and Waikato region. The smaller regional councils were there to represent the Regional Consortium. Wellington Region led the project. Based on Auckland's contract with Thales running until 2021 (with an option to extent to 2026), it was assumed that they would not join the programme and were not included in the economic analysis. The Regional Interim Ticketing Solution (RITS) was endorsed by this group. The system requirement was now account-based ticketing and open-loop payment solutions that would accommodate EMV-based credit and debit cards (e.g. Visa and mastercard) as well as tokens and digital wallets (e.g. Apple Pay). In October 2017, indicative business cases for two options had been developed (a do-minimum and a GRETS rollout). Procurement was planned to start in late 2017.

Project NEXT
The situation changed when Auckland Transport joined GRETS in early 2018 and in May 2018, this resulted in Project NEXT being formed as a successor to GRETS. The project continued to be led by Wellington Region. The Transport Agency disestablished the governance group and handed its oversight to a newly formed group called the Connected Journey Solutions (CJS) unit. When the Transport Agency's CEO, Fergus Gammie, resigned and was replaced by interim-CEO Mark Ratcliffe, concerns were raised internally and Ratcliffe commissioned professional services company Deloitte with undertaking a review of Project NEXT. CJS had already been subject to an earlier and damning audit by Deloitte and the Project NEXT was equally critical. Key criticisms included:
 Transport Agency's focus on the National Ticketing Programme (NTP) appears to have lapsed
 Lack of clear ticketing and public transport objectives
 Governance mechanisms are not fit for purpose
 Lack of business ownership
 The Project does not have the Crown-level review and assurance disciplines as expected by Deloitte

As of late 2019, it was expected that the rollout for Project NEXT would begin with the Wellington commuter rail in 2022, some two years later than previously planned. Also in 2022, the system would be implemented on the Wellington bus fleet, followed in 2023 by implementation on the services provided in the Canterbury region. The nine PTAs that form the Regional Consortium were expected to have joined by 2024. Auckland Transport is expected to adopt the system in 2026 when their current HOP card contract expires.

As of 2020, Gisborne and Marlborough districts do not plan to join Project NEXT.

In July 2021, it was announced that the rollout changed, with the Canterbury region to get the card first in late 2022, followed by the Wellington region in late 2022 or early 2023. The programme director stated that timelines may still change, though.

National Ticketing Solution
In October 2022, the system was renamed National Ticketing Solution and a contract with American transport solutions company Cubic for the development of the new fare card was signed. The rollout was again adjusted, with Canterbury still set to be the first to receive the card, in 2024. As of 2022, Gisborne has decided to join the group while Marlborough is still opting out.  It is budgeted to cost $1.3 billion over 15 years; for comparison, the Government Policy Statement on Land Transport 2021 set a funding range of $410 to $630 million for 2022-23 for public transport.

On 21 October, Minister of Transportation Michael Wood announced that the Government would invest NZ$1.3 billion with merging all bus, train and ferry fare payment systems into the National Ticketing Solution.  By this stage, Waka Kotahi (the New Zealand Transport Agency) and several urban and regional councils had signed contracts with Cubic. The national payment system would be gradually rolled out across the country and would replace all existing municipal and regional payment systems including the Bee Card.

Notes

References

External links
National Ticketing Solution -  Waka Kotahi

Fare collection systems in New Zealand